Department Q is a Danish Nordic noir film series, based on the crime novels by Danish author Jussi Adler-Olsen.

Novels
Originally written in Danish, the novels have been translated into numerous languages, including English, Bulgarian, Chinese, Croatian, Czech, Dutch, Estonian, Finnish, French, German, Greek, Hebrew, Hungarian, Icelandic, Italian, Japanese, Latvian, Lithuanian, Macedonian, Norwegian, Polish, Portuguese, Romanian, Russian, Slovakian, Slovenian, Spanish, Swedish, Turkish and Vietnamese.

Despite using the same translations, the Penguin Group titled the first five novels differently in the UK and the USA, which uses the same English titles as the film adaptations.

Films
 The Keeper of Lost Causes (2013)
 The Absent One (2014)
 A Conspiracy of Faith (2016)
  (2018)
  (2021)
Upcoming
 Boundless (2024)
 The Scarred Woman (2024)
 Victim 2117 (2026)
 The Shadow Murders (TBA)
 Untitled final film (TBA)

The first four films were produced by Peter Aalbæk Jensen and Louise Vesth through Zentropa, however despite their commercial and critical success, author Jussi Adler-Olsen was unhappy with the results and the casting, feeling that the films and characters departed from his novels too much and that his suggestions were being ignored, leading to Nordisk Film (who had already distributed the prior films in Denmark) and producer  taking over for the remainder of the series, with all the recurring roles recast.

Cast and characters

 was unable to return as Assad after  due to having recently become a father having other scheduling conflicts with the filming of Boundless, which started on 5 September 2022, half a year earlier than planned.

Crew

Reception

Box office performance

The films have been massively successful, selling over three million tickets in Denmark alone, where the installments regularly top the yearly box-office.  (2018) became the highest grossing Danish film of all time upon release, with a gross of 72,500,000 DKK, The Absent One (2014) the second highest with 68,1 M. DKK, A Conspiracy of Faith (2016) the fourth with 64,3 M. DKK, and The Keeper of Lost Causes (2012) the fifth with 59,01 M. DKK. The Purity of Vengeance is additionally the 11th overall highest grossing film in Denmark. The fifth film  however, which marked a complete recast, was significantly less successful despite a larger budget.

Critical response

References

 
Action film series